Møre-Nytt is a local newspaper published in Ørsta, Norway, which has been in circulation since 1935.

Profile
Møre-Nytt was established by Alf and Øivind Bergmann in 1935. The paper is published three times a week and is based in Ørsta. It serves the regions of Ørsta and Volda. Its website was closed in November 2012.

The Bergman family was the owner of Møre-Nytt until 2007 when its majority share was acquired by the Sunnmørsposten, a subsidiary of the Edda Media. The paper was sold to its current owner, Polaris Media, in 2009. 

In 2011 Møre-Nytt introduced digital user payment.

Møre-Nytt sold 5,526 copies in 2008. The circulation of the paper was 5,214 copies in 2013.

See also
 List of newspapers in Norway

References

External links
 

1935 establishments in Norway
Norwegian-language newspapers
Ørsta
Polaris Media
Publications established in 1935